Grand Prix de Denain is a professional cycle road race held in Denain, France. For 10 years from 2005 the race was organized as a 1.1 event on the UCI Europe Tour, before becoming a 1.HC event for the 2016 season. It is also part of the French Road Cycling Cup.

Winners

External links
 Official site 

 
UCI Europe Tour races
Cycle races in France
Recurring sporting events established in 1959
1959 establishments in France